Jenő Hámori (born 27 August 1933) is a Hungarian fencer. He won a gold medal in the team sabre event at the 1956 Summer Olympics. After the 1956 Olympics, he defected and represented the United States at the 1964 Summer Olympics.

References

External links
 

1933 births
Living people
Hungarian male sabre fencers
Hungarian emigrants to the United States
American male sabre fencers
Olympic fencers of Hungary
Olympic fencers of the United States
Fencers at the 1956 Summer Olympics
Fencers at the 1964 Summer Olympics
Olympic gold medalists for Hungary
Olympic medalists in fencing
Defectors to the United States
Sportspeople from Győr
Medalists at the 1956 Summer Olympics
Pan American Games medalists in fencing
Pan American Games silver medalists for the United States
Fencers at the 1971 Pan American Games